Mitsubishi Electric Research Laboratories (MERL) is a subsidiary of Mitsubishi Electric US Holdings, Inc., which, in its turn, is the principal subsidiary of Mitsubishi Electric in the United States. MERL is the North American arm of the Corporate R&D organization of Mitsubishi Electric. It is located in Cambridge, Massachusetts, United States.

MERL engages in application-motivated basic research and advanced development in areas of importance to Mitsubishi Electric.  More than 50 PhDs pursue research and advanced development in a wide range of areas including digital signal processing, digital audio and video processing, wired and wireless digital communications, spoken language interfaces, computer vision, mechatronics and fundamental algorithms.  Since 1991, MERL has been awarded more than 700 patents.

History
Mitsubishi Electric Research Laboratories was founded in Cambridge, Massachusetts in 1991 by the Mitsubishi Electric CR&D organization. In the late 1990s, MERL merged with two other laboratories that were part of Mitsubishi Electric. This consolidated all of Mitsubishi Electric’s North American research into one organization, creating the MERL that exists today.
Richard C. Waters, was a founding member of MERL and has been president since 1999.

László Bélády was the head of MERL from 1991 to 1998, James D. Foley,  who co-authored several of the most widely used university textbooks on computer graphics, was the president from 1998 to 1999.

Research areas

MERL conducts application motivated basic research and advanced development in

•	Electronics & Communications: Wireless and optical communications, advanced signal processing, optical and semiconductor devices, and electro-magnetics, RF& Power

•	Multimedia: Efficient acquisition, representation, processing, security, and interaction of multimedia.

•	Data Analytics: Predictive analytics, decision analytics, modeling, simulation, and optimization.

•	Spatial Analysis: Processing data from across space and time to extract meaning and build representations of objects and events in the world.

•	Mechatronics: Advanced control.

An Algorithms group supports all five sectors, developing fundamental algorithms.

Products, projects, and technology
MERL generates new technology and intellectual property, and has been involved in numerous products and projects, including:

 Generalized Belief Propagation
 Human–computer interaction via the Multi-touch DiamondTouch surface
 Saffron Type System
 Multiview Video Coding
 Ultra-wideband network technology using Orthogonal Frequency Division Multiplexing
 Seam carving

References

External links

 
 Mitsubishi Electric US

Mitsubishi Electric
Research organizations in the United States
Companies based in Cambridge, Massachusetts
Design companies established in 1991
Electronics companies established in 1991
1991 establishments in Massachusetts